Emen Island is a rocky island in the southwest part of Hamburg Bay on the northwest coast of Anvers Island in the Palmer Archipelago, Antarctica.  The feature is 920 m long in southeast-northwest direction and 580 m wide, and is separated from Anvers Island to the south and Petrelik Island to the northwest by 570 m and 160 m wide passages respectively.

The island is named after the village of Emen in Bulgaria.

Location
British mapping in 1974.

Maps
 Anvers Island and Brabant Island. Scale 1:250000 topographic map. BAS 250 Series, Sheet SQ 19-20/3&4. London, 1974.
 Antarctic Digital Database (ADD). Scale 1:250000 topographic map of Antarctica. Scientific Committee on Antarctic Research (SCAR). Since 1993, regularly upgraded and updated.

References
 Bulgarian Antarctic Gazetteer. Antarctic Place-names Commission. (details in Bulgarian, basic data in English)
 Emen Island. SCAR Composite Antarctic Gazetteer.

External links
 Emen Island. Copernix satellite image

Islands of the Palmer Archipelago
Bulgaria and the Antarctic